Abstracting electricity is a statutory offence of dishonestly using, wasting, or diverting electricity, covered by different legislation in England and Wales, Northern Ireland and the Republic of Ireland. The law applies, for instance, in cases of bypassing an electricity meter, reconnecting a disconnected meter, or unlawfully obtaining a free telephone call. In Low v Blease [1975] Crim LR 513 it was held that electricity could not be stolen as it is not property within the meaning of section 4 of the Theft Act 1968. In one reported case in 2015 a man was arrested for abstracting electricity (to the value of £0.00052) by charging his mobile telephone on a train, but was ultimately not charged. Before the Computer Misuse Act 1990 those who misused computers ("hackers") were charged with abstracting electricity, as no other law applied.

England and Wales
This offence is created by section 13 of the Theft Act 1968:

This section replaces section 10 of the Larceny Act 1916.

The following cases are relevant:
R v Hoar and Hoar [1982] Crim LR 606
Collins and Fox v Chief Constable of Merseyside [1988] Crim LR 247, DC
R v McCreadie and Tume, 96 Cr App R 143, CA

Visiting forces

This offence is an offence against property for the purposes of section 3 of the Visiting Forces Act 1952.

Mode of trial and sentence

This offence is triable either way. A person guilty of this offence is liable, on conviction on indictment, to imprisonment for a term not exceeding five years, or on summary conviction to imprisonment for a term not exceeding six months, or to a fine not exceeding the prescribed sum, or to both.

History

Section 10 of the Larceny Act 1916 provided:

Northern Ireland
This offence is created by section 13 of the Theft Act (Northern Ireland) 1969, which is identical to section 13 of the Theft Act 1968. It replaces section 10 of the Larceny Act 1916.

Visiting forces

This offence is an offence against property for the purposes of section 3 of the Visiting Forces Act 1952.

Mode of trial

This offence is an indictable offence which may be tried summarily upon consent of the accused. See hybrid offence.

Sentence

A person guilty of this offence is liable, on conviction on indictment, to imprisonment for a term not exceeding five years, or on summary conviction to imprisonment for a term not exceeding twelve months, or to a fine not exceeding the prescribed sum, or to both.

Republic of Ireland
This offence is created by section 15(2)(a) of the Energy (Miscellaneous Provisions) Act, 1995. That section replaces section 10 of the Larceny Act 1916, which was repealed by section 28 of, and the Schedule to, that Act.

References

Criminal law